Turned to the Wall is a 1911 silent short film produced by the Edison Manufacturing Company. It starred Charles Ogle, Miriam Nesbitt and Mary Fuller. Based on a story by Charles Reade.

Cast
Charles Ogle - Squire Ruby
Miriam Nesbitt _
Mary Fuller - 
William Bechtel -
Guy Coombs - Young Ruby, Squire's son

References

External links
 Turned to the Wall at IMDb.com

1911 films
American silent short films
1911 short films
Edison Manufacturing Company films
American black-and-white films
1910s American films